Peter Styles may refer to:

 Peter Styles (politician) (born 1953), Australian politician
 Peter Styles (geologist) (born ), British geologist